None for All and All for One is a limited edition EP of new material written in secret by the British alternative band Pitchshifter. The EP was given away free with every ticket purchased for every show on the 'Back From the Dead' tour in March 2006. It was also available through their store on the PSI Records website until October 2007. 'Predisposed (To Sickness)' is a cover of the This Is Menace song 'Predisposed'. The EP was re-released for download in 2018 in preparation for the band's reunion tour.

Track listing
 Burning (Out of Control) – 3:44
 Does It Really Matter? – 3:34
 Predisposed (To Sickness) – 2:46
 Burning (Out of Control) – Meltdown Mix – 4:31
 Does It Really Matter – Heat Treatment Mix – 4:04
 Burning (Out of Control) – Molotov Mix – 6:53

Personnel

Pitchshifter 
 JS Clayden –  lead vocals, guitars, programming
 Mark Clayden - bass
 Jason Bowld – drums

Additional musician 
 Billy Morrison – guitars, bass

Production 
 JS Clayden, James Edwards, Matt Terry, Rail Rogut and Rick Parkhouse – engineering
 JS Clayden and Jason Bowld – production, mixing and programming
 Mike Clink – recording
 Billy Morrison, J.S. Clayden, Jason Bowld and Mark Clayden – writers
 JS Clayden – mastering
 Rick Powell, Drawbacks and Ma Saski – remixes
 Design by DOSE-productions.com
 Front cover by Julien Morel - Joolz

Pitchshifter albums
2006 EPs